Love's Berries is a 1926 Soviet comedy film by Ukrainian director Oleksandr Dovzhenko. The film was Dovzhenko's debut, and the screenplay was written in three days. It deals with a dandified barber's attempts to get rid of his "love berry" — his illegitimate offspring.

Plot
Hairdresser Jean Colbasiuc learns from his girlfriend about an unexpected materialization of their child. Not ready to be a father, the young man tries to get rid of the baby left in his care. After a few unsuccessful attempts to place the baby onto unsuspecting citizens, by this time Colbasiuc receives a notice from the People's Court, agrees to the registration of marriage and only then learns from Lisa that the child, who served as a catalyst for the incident, was borrowed by her from her Aunt.

Cast 
 Maryan Krushelnitsky as Jean Kolbacjuk (as Maryan Krushchelnitsky)
 Margarita Barskaya as Young woman
 Dmitriy Kapka as Toys salesman
 Ivan Zamychkovsky as Tolstjak
 Volodimir Lisovsky as Old man on whom the fat man offloads
 A. Belov as Fat client
 L. Chembarsky as Fop on whom the fat man offloads
 N. Zemgano as Photographer
 K. Zapadnaia as Girl on the boulevard
 Nikolai Nademsky as Seltzer water salesman

References

External links
 

1926 comedy films
1920s Russian-language films
Soviet comedy films
Russian comedy short films
1926 films
Films directed by Alexander Dovzhenko
Dovzhenko Film Studios films
Ukrainian silent short films
Soviet black-and-white films
Ukrainian black-and-white films
All-Ukrainian Photo Cinema Administration films
1926 short films
Soviet silent short films
Russian black-and-white films
Russian silent short films
Silent comedy films